Dulwich Picture Gallery is an art gallery in Dulwich, South London, which opened to the public in 1817. It was designed by Regency architect Sir John Soane using an innovative and influential method of illumination. Dulwich is the oldest public art gallery in England and was made an independent charitable trust in 1994. Until this time the gallery was part of the College of God's Gift, a charitable foundation established by the actor, entrepreneur, and philanthropist Edward Alleyn in the early 17th century. The acquisition of artworks by its founders and bequests from its many patrons resulted in Dulwich Picture Gallery housing one of the country's finest collections of Old Masters, especially rich in French, Italian, and Spanish Baroque paintings, and in British portraits from Tudor times to the 19th century.

The Dulwich Picture Gallery and its mausoleum are listed Grade II* on the National Heritage List for England.

History

Early history of the gallery

Edward Alleyn (1566–1626) was an actor who became an entrepreneur in Elizabethan theatre. His commercial interests in the Rose and Fortune Theatres (a major competitor to the Globe Theatre), gave him sufficient wealth to acquire the Manor of Dulwich in 1605. He founded a college at Dulwich, the College of God's Gift, and endowed it with his estate. It was a school for boys and next to it were almshouses for the local poor. The college became three separate beneficiary schools – Dulwich College, Alleyn's School, and James Allen's Girls' School, named after an early 18th-century headmaster. The college, the attached almshouses and chapel survive next to the gallery on Gallery Road, although its exterior has undergone extensive renovation.

Alleyn bequeathed the college of a collection of works including portraits of the kings and queens of England. The college retained connections with the theatre and in 1686, the actor William Cartwright (1606–1686) bequeathed a collection of 239 pictures, of which 80 are now identifiable at Dulwich. In the 18th century, the collection was displayed on the first floor of the wing of the Old College. It attracted few additions during this period, and recorded descriptions of the gallery suggest disappointment and apathy from its visitors. The art historian and Whig politician Horace Walpole wrote that he saw "a hundred mouldy portraits among apostles sibyls and kings of England".

Later history – Bourgeois, Desenfans and Sir John Soane

The Dulwich collection was improved in size and quality by Sir Francis Bourgeois (1753–1811), originally from Switzerland, and his business partner, Frenchman Noël Desenfans (1744–1807). Their involvement saw the Gallery make significant steps towards its present state, and they are credited as founders of Dulwich Picture Gallery. They ran an art dealership in London and in 1790 were commissioned by the King of the Polish–Lithuanian Commonwealth, Stanisław August Poniatowski, to assemble a national collection for Poland to encourage fine arts in his country. Desenfans had lobbied the British Government to create a similar British national collection and offered to contribute to it, but was unenthusiastically received. Touring around Europe buying fine art, Bourgeois and Desenfans took five years to assemble the collection, but by 1795 the Polish–Lithuanian Commonwealth had been partitioned and no longer existed.

Bourgeois and Desenfans attempted to sell the collection but were unsuccessful. Instead, they sold small pieces to fund the purchase of other important works and kept the collection in Desenfans' house in Charlotte Street. After the death of Desenfans in 1807, Bourgeois inherited the collection. He commissioned Sir John Soane to design and construct a mausoleum at Desenfans' house, but was unable to secure the freehold. Bourgeois bequeathed his collection to the College of God's Gift on the advice of the actor John Philip Kemble, a friend of both dealers. Bourgeois left instructions in his will for the construction of a gallery in Dulwich, designed by Soane, in which to display the collection. It was next to the original college buildings by the chapel. He also left £2,000 for construction costs and £4,000 was contributed by Desenfan's widow.

The gallery was opened to students of the Royal Academy of Arts in 1815, two years before the official opening to the public, the delay due to a problem with the gallery's heating system. It became a popular venue for copyists from London schools of art. Its collection was frequented by many cultural figures over the next hundred years, many of whom first visited as students, including John Constable, William Etty, Joseph Mallord William Turner, and later Vincent van Gogh. Charles Dickens mentions Dulwich Picture Gallery in his novel The Pickwick Papers, as Samuel Pickwick, the novel's protagonist, is a visitor to the gallery in his retirement.

Modern history

In the early hours of 31 December 1966, eight paintings were stolen, three by Rembrandt, A Girl at the Window, a version of Portrait of Titus and his Portrait of Jacob de Gheyn III, a fellow artist, three by Rubens, Three Women with a Cornucopia, St. Barbara and The Three Graces; and one, A Lady Playing on the Clavicord by Gerrit Dou and Susannah and the Elders by Adam Elsheimer. They were worth at least £3 million but a reward of just £1,000 was offered for their return. Within a few days all the paintings were recovered after an investigation led by Detective Superintendent Charles Hewett, who had previously investigated suspected serial killer Dr John Bodkin Adams. Michael Hall, an unemployed ambulance driver, was the only one of the thieves caught and was sentenced to five years in prison.

Rembrandt's small early Portrait of Jacob de Gheyn III (1632) has been stolen and recovered four times and is listed in Guinness World Records as the most frequently stolen artwork in the world. Last stolen in 1983, it was recovered from a left-luggage office in the Federal Republic of Germany in 1986; returned anonymously; found on the back of a bicycle; and discovered under a bench in a graveyard in Streatham, south London. Since 2010, the painting has been guarded by an upgraded security system. In November 2019, During the Rembrandt's Light exhibition featuring loans works from the Louvre in Paris and the Rijksmuseum in Amsterdam, thieves attempted to steal two of the paintings. The paintings were recovered from the grounds.

In 1995 a major reorganisation of the historic Alleyn's College charity resulted in the reconstitution of Dulwich Picture Gallery as an independent registered charity.

The Gallery marked its bicentenary in 2017. As part of the celebrations the Gallery partnered with the London Festival of Architecture to hold a competition for emerging architects to create a 'Dulwich Pavilion', a temporary events structure to be built in the Gallery's historic grounds during the summer of 2017. The competition was won by London-based architecture practice IF_DO.

In June–September 2019, the Dulwich hosted the first major exhibition of the works of the Grosvenor School in a public art gallery outside Australia, which was critically well received.

Donors

The gallery attracted donors from its earliest days. In 1835 William Linley (1771–1835) — last of a musical and theatrical family, (many of whom had connections to Dulwich College) and brother-in-law to playwright Richard Brinsley Sheridan — bequeathed his collection of family portraits to the gallery. Among these paintings were works by Thomas Gainsborough, Archer James Oliver, James Lonsdale and Sir Thomas Lawrence.

The portraitist and Royal Academician William Beechey (1753–1839) donated a picture of the gallery's founder Bourgeois he had painted on the back of a picture by Joshua Reynolds in 1836 adding two images to the collection, although only one can be shown at a time. In 2012, the side of the canvas on display is by Reynolds.

British portrait art became better represented due to the benefaction of Charles Fairfax Murray, a Pre-Raphaelite painter, collector and dealer. A group of 40 pictures were donated by Murray in 1911 and others followed in 1915 and 1917–18.

Gallery design

Dulwich Picture Gallery's design and architecture comprising a series of interlinked rooms lit by natural light through overhead skylights has been the primary influence on art gallery design ever since. Soane designed the sky lights to illuminate the paintings indirectly. Soane's design was unrelated to traditional architectural practice or schools of architecture. Instead of constructing a facade with the stucco porticos favoured by many contemporary architects, he opted to use uninterrupted raw brick, a feature subsequently adopted by many 20th-century art galleries. The architect Philip Johnson said "Soane has taught us how to display paintings".

Before Soane settled on his final design, he proposed a number of other ideas around a quadrangle belonging to the Alleyn's charitable foundation to the south of the college buildings. The schemes proved too ambitious and only the gallery was built, conceived as one wing of the quadrangle. The mausoleum was Soane's idea, as Bourgeois had merely indicated a desire to be buried in the college chapel. Soane recalled Bourgeois' desire to construct a mausoleum in Desenfan's home and his design was axiomatic to that of the Charlotte Street house. Bourgeois and Desenfans, along with Desenfans' wife, who died in 1815, are buried in the gallery's mausoleum. Alms houses constructed by Soane along the west side of the gallery were converted into exhibition space by Charles Barry, Jr. in 1880 and an eastward extension was built to designs by E S Hall between 1908 and 1938.

On 12 July 1944, during World War II, the mausoleum and west wing galleries were badly damaged by a German V1 flying bomb and bones were scattered across the lawn in front of the gallery. The three sarcophagi in the mausoleum now contain approximately a skeleton each. The buildings were refurbished by Austin Vernon and Partners and re-opened by the Queen Mother on 27 April 1953.

A modernist cafe, education rooms, disabled access and lecture theatre by Rick Mather were added in 1999. At the same time parts of Soane's original design were restored and the latest refurbishment was opened by Queen Elizabeth II on 25 May 2000.

Collection

Dutch School
Cuyp, Aelbert – 11 paintings;
Dou, Gerrit – 1 painting;
Hobbema, Meyndert – 1 painting;
Hooch, Charles Cornelisz de – 2 paintings;
Neer, Aernout van der – 1 painting;
Ostade, Adriaen van – 5 paintings;
Rembrandt van Rijn – 3 paintings;
Ruisdael, Jacob van – 4 paintings;
Velde, Adriaen van de – 2 paintings;
Velde, Willem van de...the Younger – 3 paintings;
Weenix, Jan – 1 painting;
Wouwerman, Philip – 12 paintings;

English School
Dobson, William – 1 painting;
Gainsborough, Thomas – 7 paintings;
Hogarth, William – 2 paintings;
Landseer, Sir Edwin – 1 painting;
Lawrence, Thomas – 3 paintings;
Reynolds, Joshua – 9 paintings;
Constable, John – 1 painting;

Flemish School
Marcus Gheeraerts the Younger – 1 painting;
Rubens, Peter Paul – 10 paintings;
Teniers, David – 19 paintings;
Van Dyck, Anthony – 5 paintings;

French School
Dughet, Gaspard – 4 paintings;
Fragonard, Jean-Honoré – 1 painting;
Gellée, Claude – 4 paintings;
Poussin, Nicolas – 6 paintings;
Vernet, Claude-Joseph – 6 paintings;
Watteau, Jean-Antoine – 2 paintings;

Italian School
Canaletto, (Giovanni Antonio Canal) – 2 paintings;
Carracci, Annibale – 4 paintings;
Piero di Cosimo – 1 painting;
Guercino, (Giovanni Francesco Barbieri) – 2 paintings;
Raphael, (Raffaello Sanzio) – 2 paintings;
Reni, Guido – 2 paintings;
Ricci, Sebastiano – 2 paintings;
Tiepolo, Giovanni Battista – 3 paintings;
Vasari, Giorgio – 1 painting;
Veronese, Paolo – 1 painting;
Zuccarelli, Francesco – 3 paintings;

Spanish School
Murillo, Bartolomé-Esteban – 4 paintings;

Gallery
 

{{gallery
|height=180 
|mode=packed 
|File:Hudson, Thomas - Portrait of a Man - Google Art Project.jpg|Thomas Hudson: Portrait of a Man
|File:Gainsborough, Thomas - Thomas Linley the elder - Google Art Project.jpg|Gainsborough, Thomas: Thomas Linley the elder
|File:After Allori, Cristofano - Judith - Google Art Project.jpg|Cristofano Allori: Judith|File:Albani, Francesco - Holy Family - Google Art Project.jpg|Francesco Albani, Holy Family|File:Dahl, Michael - Portrait of a Lady - Google Art Project.jpg|Michael Dahl: Portrait of a Lady
|File:Dahl, Michael - Portrait of a Man - Google Art Project.jpg|Michael Dahl: Portrait of a Man
|File:Cope, Sir Arthur Stockdale - The Reverend William Rogers - Google Art Project.jpg|Sir Arthur Stockdale Cope- The Reverend William Rogers
|File:Hogarth, William - Portrait of a Man - Google Art Project.jpg|William Hogarth: Portrait of a Man
|File:Murillo, Bartolomé Estéban - The Madonna of the Rosary - Google Art Project.jpg|Bartolomé Estéban Murillo: The Madonna of the Rosary|File:De Gelder, Arent - Jacob's Dream - Google Art Project.jpg|Arent de Gelder: Jacob's Dream|File:Lely, Sir Peter - Portrait of a Lady in Blue holding a Flower - Google Art Project.jpg|Sir Peter Lely: Portrait of a Lady in Blue holding a Flower|File:Lely, Sir Peter - A Boy as a Shepherd - Google Art Project.jpg|Sir Peter Lely: A Boy as a Shepherd}}

Directors
Jennifer Scott became Director of Dulwich Picture Gallery in April 2017, following Ian A.C. Dejardin who had been director since 2005. From 1996 to 2005, Desmond Shawe-Taylor, now Surveyor of the Queen's Pictures, was the Director. Giles Waterfield was Director of the Dulwich Picture Gallery from 1979-1996,

See also
 Dulwich OnView, a blog-based magazine associated with the gallery
 Dulwich Outdoor Gallery, an associated distributed gallery of street art

References

External links

 Dulwich Picture Gallery official website
 
 Russell Vernon obituary, The Daily Telegraph''
 A day in the life of Ian A C Dejardin, Director of Dulwich Picture Gallery
Virtual tour of the Dulwich Picture Gallery provided by Google Arts & Culture

 
1817 establishments in England
Buildings and structures completed in 1817
Art museums established in 1817
Art museums and galleries in London
John Soane buildings
Charities based in London
Museums in the London Borough of Southwark
Picture Gallery
Georgian architecture in London
Grade II* listed buildings in the London Borough of Southwark
Grade II* listed museum buildings
College of God's Gift